Cholesteryl nonanoate, also called cholesteryl pelargonate, 3β-cholest-5-en-3-ol nonaoate or cholest-5-ene-3-β-yl nonanoate, is an ester of cholesterol and nonanoic acid. It is a liquid crystal material forming cholesteric liquid crystals with helical structure. It forms spherulite crystals.

Uses
It is used in some hair colors, make-ups, and some other cosmetic preparations; e.g. the ISP ColorFlow line is based on mixtures with e.g. cholesteryl chloride, cholesteryl oleyl carbonate and BHT. The mixture provides an opalescent, iridescent appearance. 

It is also used in some pleochroic dyes and together with e.g. cholesteryl oleyl carbonate and cholesteryl benzoate in some thermochromic applications.

It can be also used as a component of the liquid crystals used for liquid crystal displays.

References

Cholestanes
Liquid crystals
Nonanoate esters